The 2017 Eastern Michigan Eagles football team represented Eastern Michigan University in the 2017 NCAA Division I FBS football season. They were led by fourth-year head coach Chris Creighton and played their home games at Rynearson Stadium in Ypsilanti, Michigan as members of the West Division of the Mid-American Conference. The Eagles finished the season 5–7, 3–5 in MAC play to finish in fifth place in the West Division.

Schedule

Game summaries

Charlotte

at Rutgers

Ohio

at Kentucky

at Toledo

at Army

Western Michigan

at Northern Illinois

Ball State

at Central Michigan

at Miami (OH)

Bowling Green

References

Eastern Michigan
Eastern Michigan Eagles football seasons
Eastern Michigan Eagles football